Joshua Emilio Gross Santana (born 13 May 1993), known as Joshua, or simply Josh, is an Aruban footballer who plays as a midfielder for Aruban Division di Honor club Dakota and the Aruba national football team.

International career
Gross debuted on 9 September 2018 in a match against Bermuda in a 3–1 victory in the qualifying rounds of the CONCACAF Nations League.

On 22 March 2019, Gross scored his first goal, but suffered a 3–2 defeat against St. Lucia.

Honours
Dakota
 Aruban Division di Honor: 2021–22
 Torneo Copa Betico Croes: 2018–19

References

1993 births
Living people
Aruban footballers
Aruba international footballers
Eerste Klasse players
Vierde Divisie players
Derde Divisie players
ASWH players
SV Dakota players
Association football midfielders